The Kelowna Buckaroos were a Tier II Junior "A" ice hockey team from Kelowna, British Columbia, Canada.  They were a part of the British Columbia Hockey League.

Kelowna Buckaroos 1961 - 1983
Summerland Buckaroos 1983 - 1988

History
The Kelowna Buckaroos are one of the original four of the British Columbia Hockey League.  They won two league titles, a British Columbia title (the Mowat Cup), and a Doyle Cup as Alberta/BC Champions.  In 1983, the Buckaroos moved to Summerland, British Columbia.  Their season-to-season success dwindled in Summerland as they were replaced in Kelowna by the Kelowna Packers in 1985.  The Buckaroos played their final game in 1988 after four straight losing records.

Season-by-season record
Note: GP = Games Played, W = Wins, L = Losses, T = Ties, OTL = Overtime Losses, GF = Goals for, GA = Goals against

See also
List of ice hockey teams in British Columbia

Defunct British Columbia Hockey League teams
1961 establishments in British Columbia
1988 disestablishments in British Columbia